Songs for the Road is the second solo album by singer-songwriter David Ford, released as a digital download in August 2007. The physical release was released on October 15, 2007. A charts website listed "Decimate" as a chart-topper in Croatia, but has been debated as the single was never released as a single in that country, and may have been a radio-voting chart instead. Ford released his version of The Smiths' "There Is a Light That Never Goes Out" as a bonus track.

Track listing
All songs written by David Ford.

 Go to Hell
 Decimate
 I'm Alright Now
 Song For The Road
 Train
 St. Peter
 Nobody Tells Me What To Do
 Requiem
 ...And So You Fell 
 There Is A Light (Hidden Track)
 Shame, Not Regret (Hidden Track)

References

2007 albums
David Ford (musician) albums
Independiente Records albums